Thomas Chaloner is the name of:

 Sir Thomas Chaloner (statesman) (1521–1565), English statesman and poet
 Thomas Chaloner (naturalist) (fl. 1584), English naturalist
 Sir Thomas Chaloner (courtier) (1559–1615), English governor of the 'Courtly College', who introduced alum manufacturing to England
 Thomas Chaloner (regicide) (1595–1661), English politician, commissioner at the trial of Charles I and signatory to his death warrant
 Thomas Chaloner, 2nd Baron Gisborough (1889–1951), British peer
 Thomas-Chaloner Bisse-Challoner (1788–1872), aka Colonel Challoner, British militia colonel and agriculturalist
 Tom Chaloner (1839–1886), English jockey
 Thomas Chaloner, central character and narrator in a series of historical mystery crime novels by Susanna Gregory

See also
Chaloner (surname)